Roberto Schaefer,  (born in White Plains, New York) is an American cinematographer, known for his collaborations with director Marc Forster.

Career
Schaefer served as cinematographer for eight of director Marc Forster's feature films.  He was nominated for a BAFTA Film Award for his cinematography in Finding Neverland (2004). At the 2013 Camerimage, Schaefer and Forster won the Cinematographer/Director Duo Award.

Filmography

Film

Television
TV series

TV movies

References

External links

Profile at Cinematographers.nl

American cinematographers
Living people
Year of birth missing (living people)